Georgie Gleeson (born 8 September 1998) is an Australian representative sweep-oar rower. She is an Australian national champion and has represented at senior World Championships.

Club and state rowing
Gleeson first made Victorian state selection in the 2017 women's youth eight which contested and won the Bicentennial Cup at the Interstate Regatta within the Australian Rowing Championships.  She made a second Victorian youth eight appearance for another Bicentennial Cup victory in 2018. 

In 2021 Gleeson moved into the Victorian's women's senior eight which contested and won the Queen's Cup at the Interstate Regatta.  In 2022 she again raced in the Victorian Queen's Cup eight to victory.

International representative rowing
In March 2022 Gleeson was selected in the Australian senior training team to prepare for the 2022 international season and the 2022 World Rowing Championships. She raced in a single scull at the World Rowing Cup II in June 2022 to a silver medal. At the 2022 World Rowing Championships at Racize, she rowed Australia's coxless pair with Eliza Gaffney.  They finished third in the B final for an overall ninth place finish at the regatta.

References

External links
Gleeson at World Rowing

1998 births
Living people
Australian female rowers
21st-century Australian women